Abbey Harkin (born 6 May 1998 in Hunter Valley, New South Wales) is an Australian swimmer. She competed in the women's 200 metre breaststroke at the 2020 Summer Olympics but did not progress from the heats. She was selected to compete in the 100 and 200 metre breaststroke at the 2022 Commonwealth Games in Birmingham, England.

References 

 

1998 births
Living people
Australian female breaststroke swimmers
Swimmers at the 2020 Summer Olympics
Olympic swimmers of Australia
Sportswomen from New South Wales
Medalists at the FINA World Swimming Championships (25 m)
Swimmers at the 2022 Commonwealth Games
Commonwealth Games competitors for Australia
21st-century Australian women